The Yellow Scouts of Denmark — Baden-Powell Scouts (De Gule Spejdere i Danmark) were founded on 25 February 1984 as "Det Danske Pige- og Drenge Spejderkorps" with the aim of returning to a more traditional Scouting approach as a response to changes in the mainstream Danish Scouting movement.

In 1985 the name of the Association was changed to "De Gule Spejdere i Danmark — Baden-Powell spejderne".  It currently has 17 Groups.  In addition to being members of the World Federation of Independent Scouts they are members of the Danish Youth Council (DUF) which is an umbrella organization of democratic, community groups working with children and youth.

Sections

The Gule Spejdere Groups are divided into sections, with each section serving a different age range of children, youths or adults.

Promise
On my honor I promise to do my best
To be faithful to my country,
Be helpful at all times
And to keep the Scout Law.

Scout Law
 En spejder er til at stole på (A Scout is to be trusted)
 En spejder er hjælpsom og en god kammerat (A Scout is helpful and a good friend)
 En spejder er god mod dyr (A Scout is good to animals)
 En spejder tager vanskeligheder med godt humør (A Scout takes difficulties in a good mood)
 En spejder er ren i tanke, ord og handling (A Scout is clean in thought, word and deed)

See also
Scouting and Guiding in Denmark

References

Baden-Powell Scouts' Association
Scouting and Guiding in Denmark